Gordon Kesler (born 1945) is a former politician from Alberta, Canada.

Political career
Gordon Kesler's stunning victory in the February 1982 by-election for the Western Canada Concept received national media attention.  Kesler was the first separatist politician elected in Canada outside of Quebec since the 1870s, although his activities were primarily related to opposing official bilingualism and the introduction of the metric system.

After the win, Kesler became leader of the party. He won the Olds-Didsbury electoral district defeating Stephen Stiles of the Progressive Conservatives and Lloyd Quantz of Social Credit and three other candidates.

During the 1982 general election, held only months later in November, Kesler lost his seat despite Western Canada Concept fielding a full slate. He had shifted districts to his home district of Highwood after promising to move to Olds-Didsbury if elected. The time he served was the second shortest between election and defeat in the legislature's history. Harry Alger from the Progressive Conservatives defeated him with a five thousand vote plurality.

In a 1983 letter to the editor of the Alberta Report, Doug Christie, founder of the Western Canada Concept, accused Gordon Kesler of betraying separatism.  Kesler and his party had been striving to distance themselves from the controversial Christie.

Electoral record

				
					

|colspan=2 align=center|*

|}

References

External links
Early 80's Separatism
Doug Christie Letter to the editor
Alberta Legislative Assembly votes and proceedings Statement by the Speaker

1948 births
Living people
Western Canada Concept MLAs (Alberta)
Western Canadian separatists